Sarati the Terrible (French: Sarati, le terrible) is a 1937 French drama film directed by André Hugon and starring Harry Baur, George Rigaud and Jacqueline Laurent.

The film's sets were designed by the art director Émile Duquesne.

Cast
 Harry Baur as César Sarati  
 George Rigaud as Gilbert de Kéradec  
 Jacqueline Laurent as Rose  
 Rika Radifé as Remedios  
 Marcel Dalio as Benoît 
 Charles Granval as Jean Hudelot  
 Jean Tissier as Beppo  
 Jeanne Helbling as Rosy  
 Nadine Picard as Alice  
 Yvonne Hébert as Maryse  
 Pierre de Guingand as Berneville  
 Kssentini as Ahmed 
 Anny Arbo
 Louis Eymond as Un ami de Berneville

Cast
 Sarati the Terrible (1923)

References

Bibliography 
 Rège, Philippe. Encyclopedia of French Film Directors, Volume 1. Scarecrow Press, 2009.

External links 
 

French drama films
1937 films
1930s French-language films
Films directed by André Hugon
French black-and-white films
Remakes of French films
Sound film remakes of silent films
1937 drama films
1930s French films